The 5th International Qatar Cup was held in Doha, Qatar from 19 to 22 December 2018.

Medal overview

Men

Women

References

External links
Start Book
Results

2018 in weightlifting
Qatar Cup
International weightlifting competitions hosted by Qatar
Qatar Cup
Sports competitions in Doha
21st century in Doha